Origin in Death (2005) is a novel by J. D. Robb.  It is the twenty-second novel in the In Death series, preceding Memory in Death.

Plot summary

When Lt. Eve Dallas and Detective Delia Peabody are called to the murder scene of Dr. Wilfred B. Icove Sr., things already don't make sense.  Dr. Icove was renowned as a sainted genius of cosmetic and reconstructive surgery, and no one, not even his son Wilfred Icove Jr., benefits from his death.  What's even stranger are the security disks that reveal a woman (with initials DNA) walking into Icove's office, killing him with a single stab in the heart and walking out again.

When Dr. Icove Jr. is killed in the same way, Eve begins looking for another mystery woman, while her husband Roarke begins investigating an organization run by the Icoves and their partner, Dr. Jonah Wilson.  Soon, they uncover a secret world inside a private school of young girls and women, created by the Icoves and Wilson.  A world of children by design, where people aren't born, but cloned.

In Death (novel series)
2005 American novels
Novels about cloning